Jodaqiyeh (also Romanized as Jodāqīyeh; also known as Dzhudakir, Jedāqayā, Jedā Qayeh, Jodaghiya, and Judaqīr) is a village in Sain Qaleh Rural District, in the Central District of Abhar County, Zanjan Province, Iran. At the 2006 census, its population was 560, in 151 families.

References 

Populated places in Abhar County